Sternotomis variabilis, the Lesser Jewel Longhorn Beetle, is a species of flat-faced longhorn beetles belonging to the family Cerambycidae.

Description
The colors and markings of these longhorn beetles are very variable (hence the Latin name of the species). The coloration may be blue, dark green, greyish green or reddish brown, with white, pale blue, yellow or ochreous markings. Usually a wide, ochreous transverse band partially covers the pronotum and the elytra.

Distribution
This species can be found in Angola, Central African Republic, Democratic Republic of the Congo and Uganda.

References
 Biolib
 F. VITALI - Cerambycoidea
 Vincent ALLARD  THE BEETLES OF THE WORLD

Sternotomini
Beetles described in 1881